Those Wild Wyndhams: Three Sisters at the Heart of Power is a 2014 book by Claudia Renton that examines the life of the Wyndham sisters– Madeline Wyndham (1869–1941), Pamela Wyndham (1871–1928), and Mary Constance Wyndham (1862–1937). The book has two "positive" reviews, six "rave" reviews, and four "mixed" reviews, according to review aggregator Book Marks. Kirkus Reviews described it as "A sparkling family portrait and riveting history".

References

2014 non-fiction books
English-language books
William Collins, Sons books